The Multnomah County Circuit Court, which composes the 4th Judicial District of the Oregon Circuit Court system, is the general jurisdiction trial court of Multnomah County, Oregon. Judith Matarazzo is the presiding judge of the Court, serving with 37 others. The chief prosecutor is Multnomah County District Attorney Mike Schmidt.

The four court locations are: 

 Multnomah County Courthouse (Central Courthouse), located at 1200 SW 1st Ave, Portland

 Justice Center, located on the third floor of the County Jail / Police HQ building, 1120 SW 3rd Ave, Portland
 Juvenile Justice Center, 1401 NE 68th Ave, Portland
 East County Courthouse, 18480 SE Stark St, Portland

Judiciary

List of District Attorneys 

 Harl Haas (1973-1981)
 Mike Schrunk (1981—2012)
 Rod Underhill (2012—2020)
 Mike Schmidt (2020—present)

List of Public Defenders

Architecture 
The new Multnomah County Courthouse on SW 1st Ave opened October 2020. The 17-story building spans 450,000 square feet and cost $324 million. SRG Partnership was the lead architect, and Hoffman Construction Company lead contractor, both Portland based. 

The previous building, a century-old courthouse, was added to the National Register of Historic Places in 1979. It was sold in 2018 to NBP Capital for $28 million, who said it was "considering various creative uses" that would preserve the historic building. The county assessor valued it at $40 million, but estimated necessary upgrades for earthquake resistance at $70 million.

References

External Links
Courts.Oregon.gov — Multnomah County Circuit Court, 4th Judicial District

Oregon state courts
Circuit courts in the United States
Multnomah County, Oregon